Koljeh may refer to:
 Koljeh, Ardabil
 Koljeh, East Azerbaijan
 Koljeh, Zanjan